The 2009–10 Michigan Wolverines men's ice hockey team is the Wolverines' 88th season. They represent the University of Michigan in the 2009–10 NCAA Division I men's ice hockey season. The team is coached by Red Berenson and play their home games at Yost Ice Arena. Assisting Berenson will be Mel Pearson, Billy Powers, and Josh Blackburn.

Offseason
June 27: Two incoming freshmen from the University of Michigan were chosen in the 2009 NHL Entry Draft on Saturday (June 27). Forwards Chris Brown and Kevin Lynch were second-round draft picks. Brown went 36th overall to the Phoenix Coyotes, while Lynch was picked by the Columbus Blue Jackets 56th overall. Michigan's 2009-10 roster is slated to include 12 players who have been drafted by NHL franchises.

Pre-season

|- align="center"
| 1 || October 3 ||United States NTDP Under-18 || || Michigan Wolverines || || || || ||
|- align="center"
| 2 || October 4 || Windsor Lancers || || Michigan Wolverines || || || || ||
|- align="center"

Regular season

Standings

Roster
As of December 2009.

Tournaments
The Wolverines will compete in the following tournaments:
Kendall Auto Hockey Classic in Anchorage, Alaska from October 9 to 10.
17th Annual College Hockey Showcase from November 27 to 28.
45th Annual Great Lakes Invitational from December 29 to 30.
Camp Randall Hockey Classic on February 6.

Schedule

|- style="text-align:center;"
| 1 || October 9 || Alaska ||  || Anchorage, Alaska ||
|- style="text-align:center;"
| 2 || October 10 || Alaska-Anchorage ||  || Anchorage, Alaska ||
|- style="text-align:center;"
| 3 || October 22 || Niagara ||  || Ann Arbor, Mich.||
|- style="text-align:center;"
| 4 || October 24 ||Boston University||  || Boston, Mass.||
|- style="text-align:center;"
| 5 || October 30 || Lake Superior State ||  || Sault Ste. Marie, Mich.||
|- style="text-align:center;"
| 6 || October 31 || Lake Superior State ||  || Sault Ste. Marie, Mich.||
|- style="text-align:center;"

|- style="text-align:center;"
| 7 || November 6 || Miami, OH ||  || Ann Arbor, Michigan ||
|- style="text-align:center;"
| 8 || November 7 || Miami, OH ||  || Ann Arbor, Michigan ||
|- style="text-align:center;"
| 9 || November 13 || Michigan State ||  || Ann Arbor, Michigan ||
|- style="text-align:center;"
| 10 || November 14 || Michigan State ||  || East Lansing, Michigan ||
|- style="text-align:center;"
| 11 || November 20 || Bowling Green ||  || Ann Arbor, Michigan ||
|- style="text-align:center;"
| 12 || November 21 || Bowling Green ||  || Toledo, OH ||
|- style="text-align:center;"
| 13 || November 27 || Minnesota ||  || Ann Arbor, Michigan ||
|- style="text-align:center;"
| 14 || November 28 || Wisconsin ||  || Ann Arbor, Michigan ||
|- style="text-align:center;"

|- style="text-align:center;"
| 15 || December 4 || Ohio State ||  || Columbus, Ohio ||
|- style="text-align:center;"
| 16 || December 5 || Ohio State ||  || Columbus, Ohio ||
|- style="text-align:center;"
| 17 || December 11 || Notre Dame ||  || Ann Arbor, Michigan ||
|- style="text-align:center;"
| 18 || December 13 || Notre Dame ||  || South Bend, Indiana ||
|- style="text-align:center;"
| 19 || December 29 || RPI ||  ||Detroit, Michigan ||
|- style="text-align:center;"
| 20 || December 30 || Michigan State or Michigan Tech ||  || Detroit, Michigan ||
|- style="text-align:center;"

|- style="text-align:center;"
| 21|| January 8 || Western Michigan ||  || Kalamazoo, Michigan ||
|- style="text-align:center;"
| 22 || January 9 || Western Michigan ||  || Ann Arbor, Michigan ||
|- style="text-align:center;"
| 23 || January 15 || Alaska ||  || Ann Arbor, Michigan ||
|- style="text-align:center;"
| 24 || January 16|| Alaska ||  || Ann Arbor, Michigan ||
|- style="text-align:center;"
| 25 || January 22 || Ferris State ||  || Ann Arbor, Michigan ||
|- style="text-align:center;"
| 26 || January 23 || Ferris State ||  || Big Rapids, Michigan ||
|- style="text-align:center;"
| 27 || January 29 || Michigan State ||  || East Lansing, Michigan ||
|- style="text-align:center;"
| 28 || January 30 || Michigan State ||  || Ann Arbor, Michigan ||
|- style="text-align:center;"

|- style="text-align:center;"
|29 || February 4 || Bowling Green ||  || Bowling Green, Ohio ||
|- style="text-align:center;"
| 30 || February 6 || Wisconsin ||  || Madison, Wisconsin ||
|- style="text-align:center;"
| 31 || February 9 || Bowling Green ||  || Ann Arbor, Michigan ||
|- style="text-align:center;"
| 32 || February 12 || Nebraska-Omaha ||  || Omaha, Nebraska||
|- style="text-align:center;"
| 33 || February 13 || Nebraska-Omaha ||  || Omaha, Nebraska ||
|- style="text-align:center;"
| 34 || February 19 || Northern Michigan ||  || Ann Arbor, Michigan ||
|- style="text-align:center;"
| 35 || February 20 || Northern Michigan ||  || Ann Arbor, Michigan ||
|- style="text-align:center;"
| 36 || February 25 || Notre Dame ||  || Ann Arbor, Michigan ||
|- style="text-align:center;"
| 37 || February 27 || Notre Dame ||  || South Bend, Indiana ||
|- style="text-align:center;"

|-
| 2009–10 Schedule

Player stats

Skaters

Goaltenders

Postseason

NCAA hockey tournament

See also
2009 Michigan Wolverines football team
2009–10 Michigan Wolverines men's basketball team

References

External links
Official University of Michigan Athletics website
Official Site

Michigan Wolverines men's ice hockey seasons
Michigan
2009 in sports in Michigan
2010 in sports in Michigan